Sinomonas mesophila is a Gram-positive bacterium from the genus of Sinomonas which has been isolated from the gut of the fish Sillago japonica from Japan.

References

Micrococcales
Bacteria described in 2009